ToopKhāneh (which literally means "Artillery Barracks"), also spelt as Tūpkhāneh, is a major town square (Maidan-e Toopkhaneh) and a neighborhood in the south of the central district of the city of Tehran, Iran. It was built in 1867 by an order of Amir Kabir and Commissioned in 1867. After the Iranian Revolution, it was renamed Imam Khomeini Square. Cheragh Bargh (Amir Kabir) street ends-up to this square, and Naserie (Naser Khosrow) street, Bob Homayoun street, Sepah street, Ferdowsi street and Lalezar street find ways to other directions.

Buildings like Telegraphkhane, Municipality Palace and the Imperial bank building surrounded the square. The Telegraphkhane and the Municipality Palace were demolished in 1970 and 1969 respectively.

References 

Squares in Iran
Neighbourhoods in Tehran
Buildings and structures in Tehran